Zemheri is a Turkish drama television series signed by Ay Yapım, the first episode of which was broadcast on 15 January 2020, directed by Hilal Saral, written by Sema Ergenekon and starring Alperen Duymaz, Ayça Ayşin Turan,  Hazal Filiz Kucukkose   and Caner Cindoruk It ended with its 10th episode published on 18 March 2020, making it a final.

Cast and characters

Main characters
 Alperen Duymaz as Ayaz Korkmaz.
 Ayça Ayşin Turan as Firuze Pınar.
 Caner Cindoruk as Ertan Demircan.
 Hazal Filiz Küçükköse as Berrak Demircan.
 Şebnem Dönmez as Mehveş Demircan.
 Zerrin Tekindor as Aliye Pınar.

Supporting characters
 Nihal Koldaş as Safiye Korkmaz.
 Müfit Kayacan as Yaşar Pınar.
 Emir Çubukçu as Faruk Pınar.
 Aleyna Özgeçen as Elvan Pınar.
 Lila Gürmen as İclal Demircan.
 Tuğberk Sev as Korhan Korkmaz.
 Eylül Kandemir as Filiz Korkmaz.
 İlkin Tüfekçi' as Şule.
 Sahra Şaş as Sevda.
 Buket Gulbeyaz as Birsel.

Broadcast calendar

References

External links 
 Zemheri on official website of Show TV 
 
2020 Turkish television series debuts
Show TV original programming
Turkish drama television series
Television series by Ay Yapım
2020 Turkish television series endings